Rui Xingwen (1 April 1927 – 5 June 2005) was a Chinese politician who served as the Party Chief of Shanghai from 1985 to 1987, and as a member of the Secretariat of the 13th Central Committee of the Chinese Communist Party beginning in 1987. He was born in Lianshui County, Jiangsu, and joined the Chinese Communist Party in 1945. He died prior to an illness on 5 June 2005.

References

1927 births
2005 deaths
Chinese Communist Party politicians from Jiangsu
People's Republic of China politicians from Jiangsu
People from Huai'an
Political office-holders in Shanghai
Members of the Secretariat of the Chinese Communist Party
Secretaries of the Communist Party Shanghai Committee